Voni is a village in the Nicosia District of Cyprus, located just southeast of Kythrea. The village is under de facto control of Northern Cyprus.

References

Communities in Nicosia District
Populated places in Lefkoşa District